The Big Bounce may refer to:
Big Bounce, cosmic theory
The Big Bounce (novel), a 1969 crime novel
The Big Bounce (1960 film), directed by Jerry Fairbanks
The Big Bounce (1969 film), film based on the novel
The Big Bounce (2004 film), film based on the novel